The Palazzo San Giorgio or Palace of St. George (also known as the Palazzo delle Compere di San Giorgio) is a palace in Genoa, Italy. It is situated in the Piazza Caricamento.

The palace was built in 1260 by Guglielmo Boccanegra, uncle of Simone Boccanegra, the first Doge of Genoa. For the construction of the new palace, materials were used from the demolition of the Venetian embassy in Constantinople, having been obtained from Byzantine Emperor Michael VIII as a reward for Genoese aid against the Latin Empire. Stone lions – the emblem of Venice's patron St Mark – were displayed as trophies on the facade by her bitter rival, the Republic of Genoa. The palace was intended — through the creation of a civil-political center — to separate and elevate the temporal power of the Republic's government from the religious power of the clergy, centered on the Cathedral of San Lorenzo.

In 1262, Guglielmo Boccanegra was deposed and forced into exile. The palace was used for a time as a prison; Marco Polo was its most famous resident and it was there that he dictated his memoirs to Rustichello of Pisa.

In the 15th century, the palace became home to the Bank of Saint George.

Sources
Giuseppe Felloni - Guido Laura Genova e la storia della finanza: una serie di primati?  9 November 2004,

References

External links 

 
360° interactive high resolution panoramic photographs of the interiors of Palazzo San Giorgio — photographs by Hans von Weissenfluh

Buildings and structures completed in 1260
San Giorgio, Palazzo
Defunct prisons in Italy
Gothic palaces